Miami Open most commonly refers to:
Miami Open (tennis), an upper level tennis event held at Hard Rock Stadium, Miami Gardens, Florida

Miami Open may also refer to:

WCT Miami Open, a defunct World Championship Tennis tournament
Miami Open (golf), a defunct PGA Tour golf tournament
Sunshine Women's Open, a defunct LPGA Tour golf tournament also known as the Miami Open